Guarumal is a corregimiento in Alanje District, Chiriquí Province, Panama. Its population as of 1990 was 1,800; its population as of 2000 was 2,092.

References

Corregimientos of Chiriquí Province